Expert Show is Taiwanese Mandopop artist Show Lo's second Mandarin studio album. It was released on 22 October 2004 by Avex Taiwan. A second collectible edition, Expert Show (Collectible Edition) (達人Show 影音珍藏版) (CD+VCD) was released on 25 November 2004 with a bonus VCD containing four music videos.

The album features collaborations with Dee Shu (aka Xiao S) and Taiwanese boy band Energy and the music video for "小丑魚" (Clown Fish) features Rainie Yang. It also contains two songs composed by Show and the ending theme song of Taiwanese drama Outsider II (鬥魚2), starring Show.

Album
Following Show Lo's J-hip hop debut album Show Time, he broadened the 'hip hop culture' with an Eastern European style. In this he continues his partnership with producers Golden Melody Award winner and songwriter Di Zi, Bi Guoyong and Guo Jianliang; plus Chen Zihong as well as choreographer Tommy of Dance Soul studios.

 The first lead track, "機器娃娃" (Robotic Doll), is a hip hop number about the prevalence of electronic pets and on-line relationships.
 The other lead track, "戀愛達人" (Love Expert), is a mid-tempo R&B duet with Dee Shu, that talks about a couple's interaction with each other in their love of fun. It is a cover of "I Believe" by German R&B group Bro'Sis. The music video was directed by Golden Melody Award winner Kuang Sheng. It features Luo and Hsu, who play a couple who wanting a night out separate from each other, goes clubbing but bumps into each other thereby starting a game of who's-got-the-upper-hand.
 "灰色空間" (Grey Dimension) is the ending theme song of Taiwanese drama Outsider II (鬥魚), starring Luo. It is a cover of power ballad '사랑하면 할수록' Sarang hamyon hal soorok (If we are in love, then...) the theme song of Korean movie The Classic.
 The music video for "小丑魚" (Clown Fish) features Taiwanese artist Rainie Yang.
 The track and music video for "一起走吧" (Let's Go) features Taiwanese boy band Energy.
 The tracks "給你管" (Serves You Right) and "剌青" (Tattoo) were composed by Show.

Reception
The highest chart position the album achieved was two. The track "戀愛達人" (Love Expert) featuring Dee Shu is listed at number 30 on Hit Fm Taiwan's Hit Fm Annual Top 100 Singles Chart (Hit-Fm年度百首單曲) for 2004.

The track "機器娃娃" (Robotic Doll) won several awards including, one of the Songs of the Year at the 2005 Metro Radio Mandarin Music Awards presented by Hong Kong radio station Metro Info, Top 10 Mandarin Song at the 2nd Hits Song Awards in 2005, and Top 10 Gold Song (Taiwan) at the 3rd South-East Music Chart Awards in 2005.

The tracks "機器娃娃" (Robotic Doll) was nominated and "戀愛達人" (Love Expert) won one of the Top 10 Gold Songs at the Hong Kong TVB8 Awards, presented by television station TVB8, in 2005.

Track listing

Music videos
 "機器娃娃" (Robotic Doll) - directed by Lai Wei Kang/Bill Chia
 "戀愛達人" (Love Expert) - feat Xiao S - directed by Kuang Sheng
 "小丑魚" (Clown Fish) - feat Rainie Yang
 "灰色空間" (Grey Dimension) - includes clips from Outsider II
 "一起走吧" (Let's Go) - feat Energy
 "瞎攪和" (Blindly Mixed)

Releases
Two editions were released by Avex Taiwan:
 22 October 2004 - Expert Show (CD)
 25 November 2004 - Expert Show (Collectible Edition) (達人Show 影音珍藏版) (CD+VCD) - includes VCD with four music videos:
 "機器娃娃" (Robotic Doll)
 "戀愛達人" (Love Expert) - feat Dee Shu
 "小丑魚" (Clown Fish) - feat Rainie Yang
 "灰色空間" (Grey Dimension)

Charts

References

External links
  Show Lo@Avex Taiwan (2003–2007)

2004 albums
Show Lo albums
Avex Taiwan albums